The Beijing–Hong Kong high-speed railway or Jinggang high-speed railway from its Chinese name is a high-speed railway corridor of the CRH passenger service, connecting Beijing Fengtai railway station in Beijing and Futian railway station in Shenzhen, Guangdong (from there onwards to cross the border to West Kowloon station in Kowloon, Hong Kong through the XRL). The existing, conventional Jingjiu railway runs largely parallel to the line.

The line forms part of the Beijing–Hong Kong (Taipei) corridor, based on the "Eight Verticals and Eight Horizontals" railway master plan announced in 2016. Note that it goes through Shandong, Anhui, Jiangxi where Beijing–Guangzhou high-speed railway does not. The relationship between the two is much like the conventional Beijing–Kowloon railway and Beijing–Guangzhou railway, parallel yet different.

History
Construction started in 2014. The Shangqiu–Hefei and Nanchang–Ganzhou section opened in December 2019, the Ganzhou–Shenzhen section opened in December 2021.

Sections
Operational lines in the table below are marked with green background.

References

External links

Ticketing Information

High-speed railway lines in China
Standard gauge railways in China
Standard gauge railways in Hong Kong